Patrick Gamble may refer to:

 Patrick Gamble (American football) (born 1994), American football defensive end
 Patrick K. Gamble (born 1945), United States Air Force general and academic administrator